The Lactobacillaceae are a family of lactic acid bacteria. It is the only family in the lactic acid bacteria which includes homofermentative and heterofermentative organisms; in the Lactobacillaceae, the pathway used for hexose fermentation is a genus-specific trait. Lactobacillaceae include the homofermentative lactobacilli Lactobacillus, Holzapfelia, Amylolactobacillus, Bombilactobacillus, Companilactobacillus, Lapidilactobacillus, Agrilactobacillus, Schleiferilactobacillus, Loigolactobacillus, Lacticaseibacillus, Latilactobacillus, Dellaglioa, Liquorilactobacillus, Ligilactobacillus, and Lactiplantibacillus; the heterofermentative lactobacilli Furfurilactobacillus, Paucilactobacillus, Limosilactobacillus, Fructilactobacillus, Acetilactobacillus, Apilactobacillus, Levilactobacillus, Secundilactobacillus, and Lentilactobacillus, which were previously classified in the genus Lactobacillus; and the heterofermentative genera Convivina, Fructobacillus, Leuconostoc, Oenococcus, and Weissella which were previously classified in the Leuconostocaceae.

The Lactobacillaceae are also the only family of the lactic acid bacteria which does not include pathogenic or opportunistic pathogenic organisms although some species, particularly Lacticaseibacillus rhamnosus and Weissella spp. can cause rare infections in critically ill patients.

With the exception of Lactococcus lactis, Streptococcus thermophilus and Tetragenococcus halophilus, most food fermenting lactic acid bacteria are now classified in the Lactobacillaceae.

The grandfathered term lactobacilli refers to all bacteria classified in Lactobacillaceae prior to 2020, i.e. Lactobacillus sensu lato (pre-split), Pediococcus, and Sharpea. Some authors use lactobacilli to refer to Lactobacillus sensu lato only.

Leuconostocaceae
At one point five genera (Convivina, Fructobacillus, Leuconostoc, Oenococcus and Weissella) were considered a separate family called Leuconostocaceae. These three genera are non-spore-forming, round or elongated in shape, and anaerobic or aerotolerant. They usually inhabit nutrient-rich environments such as milk, meat, vegetable products, and fermented drinks. Lactic acid is the main end product of their characteristic heterofermentative carbohydrate metabolism. In 2020 Leuconostocaceae was synonymized with Lactobacillaceae.

Phylogeny
The currently accepted taxonomy is based on the List of Prokaryotic names with Standing in Nomenclature and the phylogeny is based on whole-genome sequences.

References

 
Lactobacillales
Bacteria families